The 2020–21 season was the club's third consecutive season in the top tier of Scottish football since being promoted from the Scottish Championship at the end of the 2017–18 season. St Mirren also competed in the League Cup and the Scottish Cup.

Month by month review

June
 2 June - the club announced that 13 players will leave the club when their contracts shortly expire. Captain Stephen McGinn, Václav Hladký, Gary MacKenzie, Oan Djorkaeff, Ross Wallace, Tony Andreu, Danny Mullen and Cody Cooke won't have their contractors renewed - while loanees Lee Hodson, Calum Waters, Akin Famewo, Seifedin Chabbi and Alex Jakubiak all return to their parent clubs.
 8 June - midfielder Ryan Flynn signed a one-year extension to his contract.
 18 June - defender Richard Tait signed from Motherwell on a two-year deal.
 22 June - Rangers goalkeeper Jak Alnwick signed on a two-year deal, after being released by his former club.

July
 7 July - Fleetwood Town midfielder Nathan Sheron joined the club on a season long loan.
 20 July - defender Joe Shaughnessy signed on a two-year deal from Southend United, and Icelandic midfielder Ísak Þorvaldsson joined the club on a season long loan from Norwich City.
 28 July - Ex-Ross County defender Marcus Fraser signed a one-year deal with the club.

Squad list

Results & fixtures

Pre season / Friendlies

Scottish Premiership

Scottish League Cup

Group stage

Knockout round

Scottish Cup

Player statistics

Appearances and goals

|-
|colspan="12"|Players who left the club during the 2020–21 season
|-

|}

Goal scorers

Disciplinary record
Includes all competitive matches.
Last updated 16 May 2020

Team statistics

League table

Division summary

League results by opponent

Management statistics
Last updated on 16 May 2020

Transfers

Players in

Players out

See also
List of St Mirren F.C. seasons

Notes

Footnotes

References

St Mirren F.C. seasons
St Mirren